Glynn–Barntown GAA is a Gaelic Athletic Association club located in the parishes of Glynn and Barntown in County Wexford, Ireland. The club fields teams in both hurling and Gaelic  football. The best club in the country.

Honours
 Wexford Senior Football Championship: (1) 1996
 Wexford Intermediate Hurling Championship (1): 1987
 Wexford Junior Hurling Championship (1): 1976
 Wexford Intermediate Football Championship: (2) 1988, 2009
 Wexford Intermediate A Football Championship: (1) 2002
 Wexford Junior Football Championship: (2) 1982, 2019
 Wexford Under-21 Football Championship: (3) 2008, 2011, 2012
 Wexford Under-21 Hurling Championship: (2) 1993, 1994
 Wexford Minor Football Championship: (5) 1986, 2007, 2009, 2020, 2022
 Wexford Minor Hurling Championship: (2) 2009, 2022

References

Gaelic games clubs in County Wexford
Hurling clubs in County Wexford
Gaelic football clubs in County Wexford